Latin American art is the combined artistic expression of South America, Central America, the Caribbean, and Mexico, as well as Latin Americans living in other regions.

The art has roots in the many different indigenous cultures that inhabited the Americas before European colonization in the 16th century. The indigenous cultures each developed sophisticated artistic disciplines, which were highly influenced by religious and spiritual concerns. Their work is collectively known and referred to as Pre-Columbian art. The blending of Amerindian, European and African cultures has resulted in a unique Mestizo tradition.

Colonial period

During the colonial period, a mixture of indigenous traditions and European influences (mainly due to the Christian teachings of Franciscan, Augustinian and Dominican friars) produced a very particular Christian art known as Indochristian art. In addition to indigenous art, the development of Latin American visual art was significantly influenced by Spanish, Portuguese,  and French and Dutch Baroque painting. In turn Baroque painting was often influenced by the Italian masters.

The Cuzco School is viewed as the first center of European-style painting in the Americas. In the 17th and 18th centuries, Spanish art instructors taught Quechua artists to paint religious imagery based on classical and Renaissance styles.

In eighteenth-century New Spain, Mexican artists along with a few Spanish artists produced paintings of a system of racial hierarchy, known as casta paintings. It was almost exclusively a Mexican form however, one set was produced in Peru. In a break from religious paintings of the preceding centuries, casta paintings were a secular art form. Only one known casta painting by a relatively unknown painter, Luis de Mena, combines castas with Mexico's Virgin of Guadalupe; this being an exception. Some of Mexico's most distinguished artists painted casta works, including Miguel Cabrera. Most casta paintings were on multiple canvases, with one family grouping on each. There were a handful of single canvas paintings, showing the entire racial hierarchy. The paintings show idealized family groupings, with the father being of one racial, the mother of another racial category, and their offspring being a third racial category. This genre of painting flourished for about a century, coming to an end with Mexican independence in 1821, and the abolition of legal racial categories.

In the seventeenth century, The Netherlands had captured the rich sugar-producing area of the Portuguese colony of Brazil (1630–1654). During that period, Dutch artist Albert Eckhout painted a number of important depictions of social types in Brazil. These depictions included images of indigenous men and women, as well as still lifes.

Scientific expeditions approved by the Spanish crown began exploring Spanish America where its flora and fauna were recorded. Spaniard José Celestino Mutis, a medical doctor and horticulturalist and follower of Swedish scientist Carl Linnaeus, led an expedition starting in 1784 to northern South America, the expedition is known as the Expedición Botánica de Nueva Granada. Local artists were Ecuadorean Indians, who produced five thousand color drawings of nature, all being published. The crown chartered expedition whose purpose was scientific recording of the natural beauty and wealth of Nature, was a departure from the long traditional religious art.

The most important scientific expedition was that of Alexander von Humboldt and French botanist Aimé Bonpland. They traveled for five years throughout Spanish America (1799-1804), exploring and recording scientific information as well as the attire and lifestyles local populations.<ref>Alexander von Humboldt, Voyage de Humboldt et de Bonpland, Première Partie; Relation Historique: Atlas Pittoresque: 'Vues de Cordillères et monuments de peuples indigènes de l'Amérique', Paris 1810.</ref>  Humboldt's work became an inspiration and template for continuing scientific work in the nineteenth century, as well as traveller reporters who recorded the scenes of everyday life.

In 1818, the Academy of San Alejandro in Havana, Cuba, was founded by Alejandro Ramírez, and the French painter Jean Baptiste Vermay, served as the founding director. It is the oldest academy of art in Latin America.

Historiography of colonial art and architecture
The history of Latin American art has generally been written by those with training in art history departments. However, the concept of "visual culture" has now brought scholars trained in other disciplines to write the histories of art. As with the history of indigenous peoples, for many years there was a focus on either the pre-Columbian period (Olmec, Maya, Aztec, Inca) art production, then a leap to the twentieth century. More recently, the colonial era and the nineteenth century have developed as fields of focus. Visual culture as a field increasingly crosses disciplinary boundaries. Colonial architecture has been the subject of a number of important studies.John McAndrew, The Open-Air Churches of Sixteenth-Century Mexico: Atrios, Posas, Open Chapels, and Other Studies. Cambridge: Harvard University Press 1965.James Early, Presidio, Mission, and Pueblo: Spanish Architecture and Urbanism in the United States. Dallas: Southern Methodist University Press 2004.Harold Wethey, Colonial Architecture and Sculpture in Peru. Cambridge: Harvard University Press 1949.

Colonial art has a long tradition, especially in Mexico, with there being publications of Manuel Toussaint. In recent years, there has been a boom in publications on colonial art, with some useful overviews being published in recent years.Marcus Burke, Treasures of Mexican Colonial Painting. Davenport IA: The Davenport Museum of Art 1998.Gauvin Alexander Bailey, Art of Colonial Latin America. London: Phaidon 2005Emily Umbeger and Tom Cummins,  eds.Native Artists and Patrons in Colonial Spanish America. Phoebus: A Journal of Art History. Phoenix: Arizona State University 1995. Many works deal exclusively with Spanish America.

Major exhibitions on colonial art have resulted in fine catalogs as a permanent record.María Concepción García Sáiz, Las castas mexicanas: Un género pictórico americano. Milan: Olivetti 1989.Diana Fane, ed. Converging Cultures: Art and Identity in Spanish America. Exhibition catalog.  New York: The Brooklyn Museum in association with Harry N. Abrams. 1996.Donna Pierce et al., Painting a New World: Mexican Art and Life 1521–1821. Exhibition catalog. Denver: Denver Art Museum 2004.

Gallery

Nineteenth-century

Gallery – Foreign artists in Latin America

Gallery – Latin American artists

Modernism

Modernism, a Western art movement typified by the rejection of traditional classical styles. This movement holds an ambivalent position in Latin American art. Not all countries developed modernized urban centers at the same time, so Modernism's appearance in Latin America is difficult to date. While Modernism was welcomed by some, others rejected it. Generally speaking, the countries of the Southern Cone were more open to foreign influence, while countries with a stronger indigenous presence such as Mexico, Peru, Ecuador, and Bolivia were resistant to European culture.

A landmark event for Modernism in the region was, the Semana de Arte Moderna or Modern Art Week, a festival that took place in São Paulo, Brazil, in 1922, marking the beginning of Brazil's Modernismo movement. "[T]hough a number of individual Brazilian artists were doing modernist work before the Week, it coalesced and defined the movement and introduced it to Brazilian society at large."

Constructivist movement

In general, the artistic Eurocentrism associated with the colonial period began to fade in the early twentieth century, as Latin Americans began to acknowledge their unique identity and started to follow their own path.

From the early twentieth century onward, the art of Latin America was greatly inspired by Constructivism. It quickly spread from Russia to Europe, and then into Latin America. Joaquín Torres García and Manuel Rendón have been credited with bringing the constructivism to Latin America.

After a long and successful career in Europe and the United States, Torres García returned to his native Uruguay in 1934, where he both promoted Constructivism and augmented it into a uniquely Uruguayan movement: Universal Constructivism. Attracting a circle of experienced peers and young artists as followers in Montevideo, in 1935 he founded the Asociación de Arte Constructivo as an art center and exhibition space for his circle. The venue was closed in 1940 due to a lack of funding. In 1943, he opened the Taller Torres-García, a workshop and training center that operated until 1962.

Muralism

Muralism or Muralismo is an important artistic movement generated in Latin America. It is popularly represented by the Mexican muralism movement of Diego Rivera, David Alfaro Siqueiros, José Clemente Orozco, and Rufino Tamayo. In Chile, José Venturelli and Pedro Nel Gómez were influential muralists. Santiago Martinez Delgado championed muralism in Colombia, as did Gabriel Bracho in Venezuela. In the Dominican Republic, Spanish exile José Vela Zanetti was a prolific muralist, painting over 100 murals in the country. The Ecuadorian artist Oswaldo Guayasamín (a student of Orozco), the Brazilian Candido Portinari, and Bolivian Miguel Alandia Pantoja are also noteworthy. Some of the most impressive Muralista works can be found in Mexico, Colombia, New York, San Francisco, Los Angeles, Chicago and Philadelphia. Mexican Muralism "enjoyed a type of prestige and influence in other countries that no other American art movement had ever experienced." Through Muralism, artists in Latin America found a distinctive art form that provided for political and cultural expression, often focusing on issues of social justice related to their indigenous roots.

Generación de la RupturaGeneración de la Ruptura, or "Rupture Generation," (sometimes simply known as "Ruptura") is the name given to an art movement in Mexico in the 1960s in which younger artists broke away from the established national style of Muralismo. Born out of the desire of younger artists for greater freedom of style in art, this movement is marked by expressionistic and figurative styles. Mexican artist José Luis Cuevas is credited with initiating the Ruptura. In 1958, Cuevas published a paper called La Cortina del Nopal ("The Cactus Curtain"), which condemned Mexican muralism as overly political, calling it "cheap journalism and harangue" rather than art. Representative artists include José Luis Cuevas, Alberto Gironella, and Rafael Coronel.

                                    

Nueva PresenciaNueva Presencia ("new presence") was an artist group founded by artists Arnold Belkin and Francisco Icaza in the early 1960s. In response to WWII atrocities such as the Holocaust and the atomic bomb, the artists of Nueva Presencia shared an anti-aesthetic rejection of contemporary trends in art and believed that the artist had a social responsibility. Their beliefs were outlined in the Nueva Presencia manifesto, which was published in the first issue of the poster review of the same name. "No one, especially the artist, has the right to be indifferent to the social order." Members of the group included Francisco Corzas (b. 1936), Emilio Ortiz (b. 1936), Leonel Góngora (b.1933), Artemio Sepúlveda (b. 1936), and José Muñoz, and photographer Ignacio "Nacho" López.

Surrealism
The French poet and founder of Surrealism, André Breton, after visiting Mexico in 1938, proclaimed it to be "the surrealist country par excellence." Surrealism, an artistic movement originating in post-World War I Europe, strongly impacted the art of Latin America. This is where the Mestizo culture, the legacy of European conquer over indigenous peoples, embodies contradiction, a central value of Surrealism.

The widely known Mexican painter Frida Kahlo painted self-portraits and depictions of traditional Mexican culture in a style that combines Realism, Symbolism and Surrealism. Although, Kahlo did not commend this label, once saying, "They thought I was a Surrealist, but I wasn't. I never painted dreams. I painted my own reality." Kahlo's work commands the highest selling price of all Latin American paintings, and the second-highest for any female artist. Other female Mexican Surrealists include Leonora Carrington (a British woman who relocated to Mexico) and Remedios Varo (a Spanish exile). Mexican artist Alberto Gironella, Chilean artists Roberto Matta, Mario Carreño Morales, and Nemesio Antúnez, Cuban artist Wifredo Lam, and Argentinean artist Roberto Aizenberg have also been classified as Surrealists.

Contemporary Art

Since roughly the 1970s, artists from all parts of Latin America have made important contributions to international contemporary art, from conceptual sculptors like Doris Salcedo (from Colombia) and Daniel Lind-Ramos (from Puerto Rico), to painters like Myrna Báez (from Puerto Rico), to artists working in media like photography, such as Vik Muniz (from Brazil).

Styles and trends

Figuration
European classical art styles have made a long-lasting impression on the art of Latin America. Into the twentieth century, many Latin American artists continued to be schooled in the traditional 19th-century style, resulting in a continued emphasis on figurative work. Due to the far reach of figuration, the work often spans upon a number of different styles such as Realism, Pop art, Expressionism, and Surrealism, only naming a few. While these artists confront issues that range from the personal to the political, many have a shared interest in indigenous issues and the heritage of European cultural imperialism.

One movement devoted to figuration was Otra Figuración (Other Figuration), an Argentine artist group and commune formed in 1961 and disbanded in 1966. Members Rómulo Macció, Ernesto Deira, Jorge de la Vega, and Luis Felipe Noé lived together and shared a studio in Buenos Aires. Artists of Otra Figuración worked in an expressionistic abstract figurative style featuring vivid colors and collage. Although Otra Figuración were contemporaries of Nueva Presencia, there was no direct contact between the two groups. People who are sometimes associated with the group are Raquel Forner, Antonio Berni, Alberto Heredia, and Antonio Seguí.

Parody and sociopolitical critique

Art in Latin America has often been used as a means of social and political critique. Mexican graphic artist José Guadalupe Posada drew harsh images of Mexican elites as skeletons, calaveras. This was done prior to the Mexican Revolution, strongly influencing later artists, such as Diego Rivera.
A common practice among Latin American figurative artists is to parody Old Master paintings, especially those of the Spanish court produced by Diego Velázquez in the 17th century. These parodies serve a dual purpose, referring to the artistic and cultural history of Latin America, and critiquing the legacy of European cultural imperialism in Latin American nations. Two notable artists who frequently employed this technique are Fernando Botero and Alberto Gironella.

Colombian figurative artist Fernando Botero, whose work features unique "puffy" figures in various situations addressing themes of power, war, and social issues, has used this technique to draw parallels between current governing bodies and the Spanish monarchy. His 1967 painting The Presidential Family, is an early example. The painting, echoing Diego Velázquez's 1656 Spanish court painting Las Meninas (The Maids of Honor), contains a self-portrait of Botero standing behind a large canvas. The thick, "puffy" presidential family, decked out in fashionable finery and staring blandly out of the canvas, appear socially superior, drawing attention to social inequality. According to Botero, his "puffy" figures are not meant to be satirical. He painted a powerful series of canvases, which are based on photos of torture by the U.S. military of Iraqi prisoners at Abu Ghraib prison.
.
 The deformation you see is the result of my involvement with painting. The monumental and, in my eyes, sensually provocative volumes stem from this. Whether they appear fat or not does not interest me. It has hardly any meaning for my painting. My concern is with formal fullness, abundance. And that is something entirely different.Mexican painter and collagist Alberto Gironella, whose style mixes elements of Surrealism and Pop art, also produced parodies of official Spanish court paintings. He completed dozens of versions of Velásquez's Queen Mariana from 1652. Gironella's parodies critique the Spanish rule of Mexico by incorporating subversive imagery. ‘’La Reina de los Yugos’’ or "The Queen of Yokes" (1975–81) depicts Mariana with a skirt made of upside-down ox yokes, signifying both Spanish dominance over Mexico's indigenous peoples, and those people's subversion of Spanish rule. The yokes are rendered useless by being upturned. "[Gironella's] hallmark was the use of particular Spanish Grocery cans (sardines, mussels, etc.) in his works, and soda bottle caps nailed or glued around the rim of his paintings."

Cuban artist Sandra Ramos' paintings, etchings, installations, collages, and digital animation often tackle taboo subjects in contemporary Cuban society such as racism, mass migration, communism and social injustices in contemporary Cuban society.

Photography

Photographers captured on film, indigenous peoples as well as distinct social types, such as the gauchos of Argentina. A number of Latin Americans have made significant contributions to modern photography. Guy Veloso and José Bassit photograph the Brazilian religiosity. Guillermo Kahlo photographed Mexican colonial buildings and infrastructure, such as the railway bridge at Metlac. Agustín Casasola himself took many images of the Mexican Revolution, and compiled an extensive archive of Mexican photos. Other photographers include indigenous Peruvian Martín Chambi, Mexican Graciela Iturbide, and Cuban Alberto Korda, famous for his iconic image of Che Guevara. Mario Testino is a noted Peruvian fashion photographer. In addition, a number of non-Latin American photographers have focused on the area, including Tina Modotti and Edward Weston in Mexico. Guatemalan national María Cristina Orive has worked in Argentina with Sara Facio. Ecuadoran Hugo Cifuentes has garnered attention.

Gallery

 See also 

 Visual arts by indigenous peoples of South America
 Art of Colombia
 Art in Puerto Rico
 Art of Venezuela
 Indochristian art
 Brazilian art
 Chilean art
 Cuban art
 Culture of Mexico
 Mexican art
 Mexican Muralism
 Culture of Panama
 Chilote School of Religious Imagery
 Latin American culture
 List of Ecuadorian artists
 List of Latin American artists
 Paraguayan Indian art
 Culture of Peru
 Peruvian art
 Pre-Columbian art

 References 

Further reading

 Ades, Dawn. Art in Latin America: The Modern Era, 1820-1980. New Haven: Yale University Press 1989.
Alcalá, Luisa Elena and Jonathan Brown. Painting in Latin America: 1550-1820. New Haven: Yale University Press 2014.
 Angulo-Iñiguez, Diego, et al. Historia del Arte Hispano-Americano. 3 vols. (Barcelona 1945-56).
 Anreus, Alejandro, Diana L. Linden, and Jonathan Weinberg, eds. The Social and the Real: Political Art of the 1930s in the Western Hemisphere. University Park: Penn State University Press 2006.
 
 Bailey, Gauvin Alexander. Art of Colonial Latin America. New York: Phaidon Press 2005.
 Barnitz, Jacqueline. Twentieth-Century Art of Latin America. Austin: University of Texas Press 2001.
 Bayón, D. and M. Marx. History of South American Colonial Art and Architecture. New York 1992.
 Bottineau, Yves. Iberian-American Baroque. New York 1970.
 Cali, François. The Spanish Arts of Latin America. New York 1961.
 Castedo, Leopoldo. A History of Latin American Art and Architecture. New York and Washington, D.C. 1969.
 Craven, David. Art and Revolution in Latin America, 1910-1990. New Haven: Yale University Press 2002.
 Dean, Carolyn and Dana Leibsohn, "Hybridity and Its Discontents: Considering Visual Culture in Colonial Spanish America," Colonial Latin American Review, vol. 12, No. 1, 2003.
 
 Donahue-Wallace, Kelly. Art and Architecture of Viceregal Latin America, 1521-1821. Albuquerque: University of New Mexico Press 2008.
 Fane, Diana, ed. Converging Cultures: Art and Identity in Spanish America. (exhibition catalogue Brooklyn Museum of Art 1996.
 
 Frank, Patrick, ed. Readings in Latin American Modern Art. New Haven: Yale University Press 2004.
 Goldman, Shifra M. Dimensions of the Americas: Art and Social Change in Latin America and the United States. Chicago: University of Chicago Press 1994.
 Isabella Stewart Gardner Museum. The Word Made Image: Religion, Art, and Architecture in Spain and Spanish America, 1500-1600. Boston 1998.
 Kagan, Richard. Urban Images of the Hispanic World, 1493-1793. New Haven: Yale University Press 2000.
 Keleman, Pal. Baroque and Rococo in Latin America. New York 1951.
 Latin American Artists of the Twentieth Century. New York: MoMA 1992.
 Latin American Spirit: Art and Artists in the United States. New York: Bronx Museum 1989.
 Padilla, Carmela, ed. Conexiones/Connections in Spanish Colonial Art. Santa Fe 2002.
 Palmer, Gabrielle and Donna Pierce. Cambios: The Spirit of Transformation in Spanish Colonial Art. Exhibition Catalog, Santa Barbara Museum of Art 1992.
 Ramírez, Mari Carmen and Héctor Olea, eds. Inverted Utopias: Avant Garde Art in Latin America. New Haven: Yale University Press 2004.
 
 
 Scott, John F. Latin American Art: Ancient to Modern. Gainesville: University of Florida Press 1999.
 Los Siglos de Oro en los Virreinatos de América, 1550-1700. Exh. cat. Madrid: Museo de América, 1999.
 Sullivan, Edward. Latin American Art. London: Phaidon Press, 2000.
 
 Turner, Jane, ed. Encyclopedia of Latin American and Caribbean Art. New York: Grove's Dictionaries 2000.
 Webster, Susan Verdi. Lettered Artists and the Languages of Empire: Painters and the Profession in Early Colonial Quito. Austin: University of Texas Press 2017. 

External links
 Walker, John. "Latin American Art". Glossary of Art, Architecture & Design since 1945'', 3rd. ed.
 Museum of Latin American Art
 Latineos - Latin America, Caribbean, arts and culture
 Vistas: Visual Culture in Spanish America, 1520-1820

 
South American art